Mario Joseph Ciampi (April 27, 1907 – July 6, 2006) was an American architect and urban planner best known for his modern design influence on public spaces and buildings in the San Francisco Bay Area.

Biography
Ciampi's parents emigrated from Italy to California in 1906. Guido and Palmira Ciampi travelled on the SS Deutschland from Genoa, arriving at Ellis Island, New York on 3 March 1906. They had friends in San Francisco and arrived there just in time for the great San Francisco earthquake of April 18. The devastation caused by the earthquake and subsequent fire forced them to live in an Army issue tent on the Presidio for several months. Mario was born in San Francisco twelve months after the fire, on 27 April 1907.

Soon afterwards the family moved to Schellville, California near Sonoma, where Guido became a farmer. The farm had vegetables, fruit trees, animals, and a vineyard which eventually earned bonded winery status.  As teenagers, Mario with his brothers Paul and Joe worked on the family vineyard and made extra money making wooden shipping crates for the neighboring Sebastiani Winery.

"From an early age he precociously sketched buildings for fun, and later seriously for Sonoma Valley friends and neighbors, but there was no money to send him to architecture school.  So he entered the profession in the old way -- old-fashioned even in 1925 -- by going straight from high school to an apprenticeship in the San Francisco firm of Alexander Cantin and Dodge A. Riedy, who had worked on the great Pacific Telephone Building with Timothy L. Pflueger.

"Working as a draftsman by day and taking night classes at the San Francisco Architectural Club..., Ciampi soon became a remarkable delineator in the Beaux Arts manner.  Like almost all architects of his generation, he was still an eclectic, inspired by historic styles….

"Drawings of this quality won him successive scholarships to the Harvard Graduate School of Design, where he was admitted in 1931 and 1932 as a special student (because he had no bachelor's degree).

"He returned to San Francisco after a stint at the Ecole des Beaux-Arts and an extensive tour of Europe under a traveling fellowship arranged by Harvard."  

Ciampi founded his design firm, M.J.C. and Associates, in 1945. Professional works of Mario Ciampi include the design and construction of university buildings, schools, churches, and commercial buildings including joint ventures with architectural organizations and collaboration with painters, sculptors and artists.  He was commissioned to develop the Downtown Plan for San Francisco in 1963 including beautification of Market Street, Embarcadero, Hallidie, and United Nations Plazas.  Much of his work was completed under the administrations of Christopher, Shelley, Alioto, Moscone, and Feinstein.

Ciampi was the urban design consultant for the Golden Gateway, Embarcadero Plaza, Rockefeller Center, Fisherman's Wharf, Yerba Buena Center, and freeway study for San Francisco with CAL TRANS.  He developed the master plans for the University of Alaska, Fairbanks, and St. Mary's College, Moraga.

"Probably his most important achievement -- prototypically Modern in its 'rational' elegance -- is the breathtaking series of 'air foil' overpasses and interchanges along Interstate 280 [California] as it winds down the Peninsula.

"Designed in 1965, after public protest compelled state highway engineers to seek outside help for aesthetics, Ciampi's streamlined concrete structures … transformed a crude preliminary scheme into one of the most gracious freeways in the world."

"Mario Ciampi, FAIA, architect of the extraordinary Berkeley Art Museum, designed numerous innovative schools in the late 1950s and 1960s.  Among them are the Westmoor School, with its precast concrete barrel vaults spanning sixty feet; the Fernando Rivera Elementary School, with a prefabricated wood folded plate roof; and the circular Vista Mar School, all in Daly City; and an elementary school for Ciampi's hometown of Sonoma.  All are characterized by novel structural systems integrating clerestory lighting, leaving large wall surfaces that incorporate significant artwork in relief."

In 1959, Ciampi received two honor awards from the American Institute of Architects, out of five awards given during that year. "San Francisco architect Mario J. Ciampi's two schools, the Sonoma Elementary School in Sonoma and the Westmoor High School, Daly City [were] named among five buildings to get First Honor Awards from the American Institute of Architects.  He was the only architect to get two top winners and the only one from Northern California to be named in this category or in the Awards of Merit."  

Ciampi won the AIA honor award for the Junipero Serra Overpass for Highway 280 near San Francisco, CA.

Ciampi won AIACC's 25-Year Award in 1996 for the Berkeley Art Museum. The AIACC also awarded Ciampi their Maybeck Award in 2000 recognizing his entire body of work.

The cover of Fortune magazine October 1958 featured one of Mario Ciampi's award-winning schools.

Mario Ciampi received the National Award AIA for construction of plazas and beautification of Market Street, San Francisco.  Additionally, he received a Certificate of Appreciation from the Board of Supervisors for the Urban development of Market Street.  He received the first Albert J. Exers Award for Urban Design, San Francisco and was the winner of the San Francisco Art Festival Prize with a lifetime exhibition in 1970.

He died age 99 on July 6, 2006, of heart failure in San Rafael, California.  Mario Ciampi was survived by his wife, Carolyn Ciampi of Kentfield, and his nephew, Norman Ciampi of Novato.

The Berkeley Art Museum was opened in 1970 at the UC Berkeley campus with "raw shells of rectangular concrete reflecting the style known as Brutalism, a short-lived architectural style that fell out of favor almost as soon as it arrived on the scene."  The closing day of the museum was Sunday, December 21, 2014, and the future of the building is uncertain.  The City of Berkeley declared it to be a landmark in 2012.

Education
Ciampi's education in the field of architecture included:
 1927-29 San Francisco Architectural Club (night college)
 1925-29 Apprentice draftsman with Alexander Cantin and Dodge A. Riedy, Architects, San Francisco
 1930-32 Harvard University Graduate School of Architecture. Ciampi won two National Design Competition Scholarships to Harvard in 1930 and 1931.
 1932-33 Studied Architecture at Beaux-Arts Institute of Design, Paris, France
 1935 Received Certificate to practice architecture in State of California

Works

Lawton School (1940) San Francisco, California
Cresta Auto Parts Building (1948) San Francisco, California (Demolished)
Mission Street Mixed Use Building (1948) San Francisco, California
Mission Street Commercial Building (1949) San Francisco, California
All Souls Catholic School (1949) San Francisco, California
Corpus Christi Catholic Church (1952) San Francisco, California
Sassarini Elementary School (1952) Sonoma, California
San Miguel School Addition (1953) San Francisco, California
Olimpia School (1954) Daly City, California (now Doelger Art Center)
War Memorial Community Center (Circa 1955) Daly City, California (Demolished) 
Westmoor High School (1956)  Daly City, California (with landscape architect Lawrence Halprin).
Vista Grande School (1958) Daly City, California (Demolished)
 Marjorie H. Tobias (Vista Mar) Elementary School (1958) Daly City, California.
Fernando Rivera Elementary School (1960) Daly City, California (now Doelger Center)
Oceana High School (1962) Pacifica, California
 St. Peter's Church (1964) Pacifica, California (Demolished) 
Interstate 280 between San Francisco and San Jose, California, including the Doran Memorial Bridge near Hillsborough (1963-1967)
Newman Hall Holy Spirit Parish (1967) Berkeley, California
UC Berkeley Bakar Bioenginuity Hub (renovated by MBH Architects in 2022, previously Woo Hon Fai Hall, the Berkeley Art Museum and Pacific Film Archive) (1970) Berkeley, California
Justin Herman Plaza (1971) San Francisco, California (with architects Don Carter, John Bolles and Lawrence Halprin)  
Hallidie Plaza (1973) San Francisco, California (with architects John Carl Warnecke and Lawrence Halprin)  
United Nations Plaza (1975) San Francisco, California (with architects John Carl Warnecke and Lawrence Halprin)

References

External links
 San Francisco Chronicle article on Ciampi
 San Francisco Chronicle article on Ciampi 
 San Francisco Chronicle obituary
 Berkeley Art Museum
 picture by Ciampi of Westmoor High School
 Finding aid to the Mario J. Ciampi Collection at the Environmental Design Archives, University of California, Berkeley
 
 Bennett, Carole, Ed.D.  Personal family interview of Mario Ciampi, 95 years old, August 1, 2001.
 Ciampi, Mario J.,  "Background and Experience -- February 1, 1998," a resume.
  Julius Shulman photographs of St. Peter Church in Pacifica, CA. 1964
  Julius Shulman photographs of Corpus Christi Church San Francisco, CA. 1955

1907 births
2006 deaths
Harvard Graduate School of Design alumni
Architects from California
20th-century American architects
American people of Italian descent